Estahuiyeh (also Romanized as Estāhū’īyeh; also known as Estakhr, Estākhū’īyeh, Istahu, and Ostāhū’īyeh) is a village in Raviz Rural District, Koshkuiyeh District, Rafsanjan County, Kerman Province, Iran. At the 2006 census, its population was 120, in 34 families.

References 

Populated places in Rafsanjan County